Packed red blood cells, also known as packed cells, are red blood cells that have been separated for blood transfusion. The packed cells are typically used in anemia that is either causing symptoms or when the hemoglobin is less than usually 70–80 g/L (7–8 g/dL). In adults, one unit brings up hemoglobin levels by about 10 g/L (1 g/dL). Repeated transfusions may be required in people receiving cancer chemotherapy or who have hemoglobin disorders. Cross-matching is typically required before the blood is given. It is given by injection into a vein.

Side effects include allergic reactions such as anaphylaxis, red blood cell breakdown, infection, volume overload, and lung injury. With current preparation methods, the risk of viral infections such as hepatitis C and HIV/AIDS are less than one in a million.  Packed red blood cells are produced from whole blood or by apheresis. They typically last for three to six weeks.

The widespread use of packed red blood cells began in the 1960s. It is on the World Health Organization's List of Essential Medicines. A number of other versions also exist including whole blood, leukocyte reduced red blood cells, and washed red blood cells.

Medical uses

RBCs are used to restore oxygen-carrying capacity in people with anemia due to trauma or other medical problems, and are by far the most common blood component used in transfusion medicine. Historically they were transfused as part of whole blood, but are now typically used separately as RBCs and plasma components.

More than 100 million units of blood are collected each year around the world, and about 50% of these are given to people in high income countries.

In low-income countries, the majority of blood transfusions (up to 65%) are given to children under 5 years of age to treat severe childhood anemia. Another major use of blood in low income countries is to treat pregnancy-related complications. Whereas in high-income countries, most blood transfusions are given to people over 65 years of age (up to 76%). In these countries transfusion are most commonly used for supportive care in heart surgery, transplant surgery, massive trauma, and therapy for solid and blood cancers. Due to changes in surgical practices, medical use of blood is now the major use of red blood cells in high-income countries.

Whenever a red cell transfusion is being considered for an individual patient it is good practice to consider not only the hemoglobin level, but also the overall clinical context, patient preferences, and whether there are alternative treatments. If a person is stable and has a hematinic deficiency they should be treated for the deficiency (iron deficiency, B12 deficiency, or folate deficiency) rather than being given a red cell transfusion.

In adults blood transfusion is typically recommended when hemoglobin levels reach 70 g/L (7 g/dL) in those who have stable vital signs, unless they have anemia due to a hematinic deficiency. Transfusing at a restrictive hemoglobin threshold of between 70 g/L to 80 g/L (7 to 8g/dL) decreased the proportion of people given a red blood cell transfusion by 41% across a broad range of clinical specialties, including those people who are critically ill. There is no evidence that a restrictive transfusion strategy affects death or major adverse events (e.g. cardiac events, myocardial infarction, stroke, pneumonia, thromboembolism, infection) compared with a liberal transfusion strategy. There is not enough information in some patient groups to say whether a restrictive or liberal transfusion threshold is better.

Single unit transfusion 
This refers to transfusing a single unit or bag of red blood cells to a person who is not bleeding and haemodynamically stable followed by an assessment to see if further transfusion is required. The benefits of single unit transfusion include reduced exposure to blood products. Each unit transfused increases the associated risks of transfusion such as infection, transfusion associated circulatory overload and other side effects. Transfusion of a single unit also encourages less wastage of red blood cells.

Upper gastrointestinal bleeding 
In adults with upper gastrointestinal bleeding transfusing at a higher threshold caused harm (increased risk of death and bleeding).

Heart surgery 
A review established that in patients undergoing heart surgery a restrictive transfusion strategy of 70 to 80g/L (7 to 8g/dL) is safe and decreased red cell use by 24%.

Heart disease 
There is less evidence available for the optimal transfusion threshold for people with heart disease, including those who are having a heart attack. Guidelines recommend a higher threshold for people with heart disease of 80g/L (8 g/dL) if they are not undergoing cardiac surgery.

Blood cancers 
There is insufficient evidence to suggest how to manage anemia in people with blood cancers in terms of transfusion thresholds.

Transfusion–dependent anemia 
People with thalassaemia who are transfusion dependent require a higher hemoglobin threshold to suppress their own red cell production. To do this their hemoglobin levels should not be allowed to drop below 90 to 105g/L (9 to 10.5g/dL).

There is insufficient evidence to recommend a particular hemoglobin threshold in people with myelodysplasia or aplastic anemia, and guidelines recommend an individualized approach to transfusion.

Children 
There is less evidence for specific transfusion thresholds in children compared to adults. There has only been one randomized trial assessing different thresholds in children, and this showed no difference between a restrictive or liberal transfusion strategy. This trial used similar thresholds to the adult studies, and transfusing when the hemoglobin is less than 70g/L is also recommended in children.

Neonates 
Neonatal red cell transfusion, and when it is appropriate depends on: the gestational age of the baby; how long since the baby had been born; and also on whether the baby is well or ill.

Side effects
Side effects can include allergic reactions including anaphylaxis, red blood cell breakdown, fluid overload, infection, and lung injury. Giving incompatible RBCs to a person can be fatal.

With current testing methods in high-income countries the risk of infection is very low. However, in low-income countries the risk of a blood donation being positive for HIV, hepatitis C, or syphilis is approximately 1%, and the risk of it being hepatitis B positive is approximately 4%. Although the World Health Organization recommends that all donated blood is screened for these infections, at least 13 low-income countries are unable to screen all their donated blood for at least one of these infections.

Compatibility testing 

To avoid transfusion reactions, the donor and recipient blood are tested, typically ordered as a "type and screen" for the recipient.  The "type" in this case is the ABO and Rh type, specifically the phenotype, and the "screen" refers to testing for atypical antibodies that might cause transfusion problems.  The typing and screening are also performed on donor blood.  The blood groups represent antigens on the surface of the red blood cells which might react with antibodies in the recipient.

The ABO blood group system has four basic phenotypes: O, A, B, and AB.  In the former Soviet Union these were called I, II, III, and IV, respectively.  There are two important antigens in the system: A and B.  Red cells without A or B are called type O, and red cells with both are called AB.  Except in unusual cases like infants or seriously immunocompromised individuals, all people will have antibodies to any ABO blood type that isn't present on their own red blood cells, and will have an immediate hemolytic reaction to a unit that is not compatible with their ABO type.  In addition to the A and B antigens, there are rare variations which can further complicate transfusions, such as the Bombay phenotype.

The Rh blood group system consists of nearly around 50 different antigens, but the one of the greatest clinical interest is the "D" antigen, though it has other names and is commonly just called "negative" or "positive."  Unlike the ABO antigens, a recipient will not usually react to the first incompatible transfusion because the adaptive immune system does not immediately recognize it.  After an incompatible transfusion the recipient may develop an antibody to the antigen and will react to any further incompatible transfusions.  This antibody is important because it is the most frequent cause of hemolytic disease of the newborn.  Incompatible red blood cells are sometimes given to recipients who will never become pregnant, such as males or postmenopausal women, as long as they do not have an antibody, since the greatest risk of Rh incompatible blood is to current or future pregnancies.

For RBCs, type O negative blood is considered a "universal donor" as recipients with types A, B, or AB can almost always receive O negative blood safely.  Type AB positive is considered a "universal recipient" because they can receive the other ABO/Rh types safely.  These are not truly universal, as other red cell antigens can further complicate transfusions.

There are many other human blood group systems and most of them are only rarely associated with transfusion problems.  A screening test is used to identify if the recipient has any antibodies to any of these other blood group systems.  If the screening test is positive, a complex set of tests must follow to identify which antibody the recipient has by process of elimination.  Finding suitable blood for transfusion when a recipient has multiple antibodies or antibodies to extremely common antigens can be very difficult and time-consuming.

Because this testing can take time, doctors will sometimes order a unit of blood transfused before it can be completed if the recipient is in critical condition.  Typically two to four units of O negative blood are used in these situations, since they are unlikely to cause a reaction.  A potentially fatal reaction is possible if the recipient has pre-existing antibodies, and uncrossmatched blood is only used in dire circumstances.  Since O negative blood is not common, other blood types may be used if the situation is desperate.

Collection, processing, and use 

Most frequently, whole blood is collected from a blood donation and is spun in a centrifuge. The red blood cells are denser and settle to the bottom, and the majority of the liquid blood plasma remains on the top. The plasma is separated and the red blood cells are kept with a minimal amount of fluid. Generally, an additive solution of citrate, dextrose, and adenine is mixed with the cells to keep them alive during storage. This process is sometimes done as automated apheresis, where the centrifuging and mixing take place at the donation site. Most blood banks utilize automated centrifugation systems to wash or volume reduce the blood products they produce and distribute.

The other options is using the person's own blood. This is known as autologous blood transfusion. The person's red blood cells are collected and can be washed by different methods. The two main methods that are used to wash the cells are centrifugation, or filtration methods. The last option is reinfusion without washing. This is the least preferred method because of the chance of complications.

Red blood cells are sometimes modified to address specific needs. The most common modification is leukoreduction, where the donor blood is filtered to remove white cells, although this is becoming increasingly universal throughout the blood supply (over 80% in the US, 100% in Europe). The blood may also be irradiated, which destroys the DNA in the white cells and prevents graft versus host disease, which may happen if the blood donor and recipient are closely related, and is also important for immunocompromized patients. Other modifications, such as washing the RBCs to remove any remaining plasma, are much less common.

With additive solutions, RBCs are typically kept at refrigerated temperatures for up to 45 days. In some patients, use of RBCs that are much fresher is important; for example, US guidelines call for blood less than seven days old to be used for neonatals, to "ensure optimal cell function". However, the phenomenon of RBC storage lesion and its implications for transfusion efficacy are complex and remain controversial (see blood bank and blood transfusion articles).

With the addition of glycerol or other cryoprotectants, RBCs can be frozen and thus stored for much longer (this is not common). Frozen RBCs are typically assigned a ten-year expiration date, though older units have been transfused successfully. The freezing process is expensive and time-consuming and is generally reserved for rare units such as ones that can be used in patients that have unusual antibodies.  Since frozen RBCs have glycerol added, the added glycerol must be removed by washing the red blood cells using special equipment, such as the IBM 2991 cell processor in a similar manner to washing RBCs.

The processing (often termed "manufacture", since the result is deemed a biologic biopharmaceutical product) and the storage can occur at a collection center or a blood bank. RBCs are mixed with an anticoagulant and storage solution which provides nutrients and aims to preserve viability and functionality of the cells (limiting their so-called "storage lesion"), which are stored at refrigerated temperatures for up to 42 days (in the US), except for the rather unusual long-term storage in which case they can be frozen for up to 10 years. The cells are separated from the fluid portion of the blood after it is collected from a donor, or during the collection process in the case of apheresis. The product is then sometimes modified after collection to meet specific patient requirements.

Red blood cell rejuvenation is a method to increase levels of 2,3-diphosphoglycerate (2,3-DPG) and ATP in stored pRBC. This process requires incubating the packed red blood cells with a rejuvenation solution and subsequent washing. For a particular combination of preservation fluid and rejuvenation solution, the FDA allows pRBC up to 3 days past the 42-day expiration period to be rejuvenated and used. 2,3-DPG levels in pRBC greatly affects oxygen-release characteristics.

Society and culture

Economics 
In the United Kingdom they cost about £120 per unit.

Names 
The product is typically abbreviated RBC, pRBC, PRBC, and sometimes StRBC or even LRBC (the latter being to indicate those that have been leukoreduced, which is now true for the vast majority of RBC units). The name "Red Blood Cells" with initial capitals indicates a standardized blood product in the United States. Without capitalization, it is simply generic without specifying whether or not the cells comprise a blood product, patient blood, etc. (with other generic terms for it being "erythrocyte" and "red cell").

References 

Blood cells
Blood products
Hematology
Transfusion medicine
Wikipedia medicine articles ready to translate
World Health Organization essential medicines